Vempa is a village of Bhimavaram mandal in West Godavari district of Andhra Pradesh, India.

Villages in West Godavari district